Claire Ptak is an American baker, food writer, and food stylist. She owns and runs a bakery-café, Violet Cakes, in London's East End. Alongside running her own business, Ptak has also published an array of cookbooks and written a food column for the Guardian and the Observer Food Monthly.  She is widely known for having baked the royal wedding cake for the wedding of the Duke and Duchess of Sussex – a layered sponge filled and covered with a lemon and elderflower buttercream icing.

Early life
Claire Ptak grew up in Inverness, California, where she learned to bake with her mother and grandmother.  She baked a cake for a friend's wedding when she was just seventeen and worked at local bakers, Bovine Bakery and Cakework.  She went on to study film at Mills College in California and worked as a film and fashion assistant in San Francisco following her graduation.

Career

Ptak served as a pastry chef at Chez Panisse, where she was mentored by Alice Waters for three years.  In 2005, she moved to London and quickly became a food stylist for celebrity chefs such as Yotam Ottolenghi, Nigella Lawson, and Jamie Oliver. Alongside her food styling, Claire writes a food column for The Guardian and has published five cookbooks. In 2008, Ptak began running a stall at Broadway Market in East London, where she sold cookies, pies, and cakes made at home with fresh buttercream flavoured with seasonal ingredients. Following two years at the market, Ptak expanded the business out of her home and moved the Violet Cakes stall to a derelict building in Hackney, which she renovated into a bakery-café. Initially, she planned to just use it for cooking and baking, but local enthusiasm encouraged her to open it as a shop and café.

Royal involvement
Violet Cakes was commissioned to bake the cake for the wedding of Prince Harry and Meghan Markle in 2018 since Markle had read Ptak's book The Violet Bakery Cookbook, and interviewed her for her lifestyle blog, The Tig. Ptak brought six different samples to Kensington Palace for the couple to taste and they selected the Amalfi lemon and elderflower flavour; an unconventional choice which was Ptak's own favourite.  The cake took a total of five days to prepare, with the final touches such as fresh flowers being added during the ceremony. Many of the ingredients, such as the elderflower syrup, were sourced from the Queen's estate at Sandringham. 

Ptak made the cake for Lilibet Mountbatten-Windsor, Prince Harry and Meghan's daughter, for her first birthday held in London in June 2022.

Writing 
Ptak has written and co-written several cookery books over the last decade. Her works include:

 The Whoopie Pie Book (2012)
 Leon: Baking & Puddings (2013)
 Boiled Sweets and Hard Candy (2013)
 Home-Made Chocolates and Truffles (2014)
 The Old-Fashioned Hand-Made Sweet Shop Recipes Book (2015)
 The Violet Bakery Cookbook (2015)

References

External links
 
 

American bakers
American cookbook writers
Pastry chefs
Mills College alumni
People from Inverness, California
20th-century American women writers
21st-century American women writers
American emigrants to England
Writers from California
Year of birth missing (living people)
American women non-fiction writers
20th-century American non-fiction writers
21st-century American non-fiction writers
Living people